Great Temptation was an Australian game show, produced by Reg Grundy Productions Pty. Ltd., that aired on the Seven Network from 1970 until 1974. It was hosted by Tony Barber and co-hosted by Barbara Rogers.

In addition to the daytime series known simply as (New World) Temptation, an hour-long prime time version titled $25,000 Great Temptation premiered on 5 July 1971. It initially aired once a week, but later expanded to airing twice a week in 1972 and five nights a week in 1973 and 1974.

Reg Grundy was inspired by the original Sale of the Century that first aired in the United States in 1969, but he did not gain full rights to produce his own Australian version of Sale until 1980. The similar format of Great Temptation was a quiz with three contestants who gained a dollar amount for each correct answer. At regular times during the show, the leading contestant was able to "buy" a valuable prize for a small nominal amount that was deducted from his or her score. That prize remained his or hers regardless of his or her success on the show. The winner of each episode was able to return the next day or take a major prize and leave. The major prizes at the end of each show accumulated but were lost if the contestant was beaten on a subsequent show.

According to Barber, a contestant died onstage during the taping of a 1970s episode of Great Temptation. Barber congratulated her on winning the game; she then slumped over and the production staff cleared the studio and called paramedics.  That episode was not broadcast.

References

Seven Network original programming
1970s Australian game shows
1970 Australian television series debuts
1975 Australian television series endings
English-language television shows
Television shows set in Melbourne
Television series by Reg Grundy Productions
Black-and-white Australian television shows